Rýmařov is a town in Bruntál District in the Moravian-Silesian Region of the Czech Republic. It has about 8,000 inhabitants. The historic town centre is well preserved and is protected by law as an urban monument zone.

Administrative parts
Villages of Edrovice, Harrachov, Jamartice, Janovice, Ondřejov and Stránské are administrative parts of Rýmařov.

Geography
It is located in the Nízký Jeseník mountain range, at the confluence of the Podolský Stream with several other small streams. The Podolský Creek is the right tributary of the Moravice, which forms the eastern municipal border.

History

The first settlement was established in the site of Rýmařov in the early 13th century by Czech colonists, but around 1250 it was destroyed. It was renewed by German colonists in the second half of the 13th century. The first written mention of Rýmařov is from 1351. After 1350, a wooden fortress was built. In 1406, the village was promoted to a town.

The great development of Rýmařov and the whole region occurred with the mining of iron ore. Gold, silver with lead, copper and later zinc were also mined here. In 1474, the town was looted by Hungarian army. In the 16th century, Rýmařov prospered and developed, the hammer mills brought wealth to the town. Lutheranism began to prevail among the inhabitants. In 1583 the estate was bought by the Tyrolean aristocratic Hoffmann of Grünbüchl family, who took care of the town and developed education and forestry.

Prosperity ended with the Thirty Years' War. The town was occupied by the army under Lennart Torstensson in 1643–1650 and remained depopulated and poor after the army left. Re-Catholicization took place after the war. In the second half of the 17th century, the town was threatened by the Northern Moravia witch trials, but in the end they did not bring any loss of life.

In 1721 the estate was bought from the Teutonic Order by the Harrach family, which became a new impetus for development. The Harrachs restored forestry, mines and smelters. In the first half of the 19th century, modern flax and cotton processing factories were established in and around the town. In 1878, the railway was opened.

Until 1918, Römerstadt was part of the Austrian monarchy (Austria side after the compromise of 1867), head of the district of the same name, one of the 34 Bezirkshauptmannschaften in Moravia.

After the World War I, the Czechoslovak government suppressed efforts to annex the area to Germany, and Czech workers began to come to the town where the German population dominated. In 1930, Germans made up 96% of the population.

In 1938, it was annexed by Nazi Germany as a part of Reichsgau Sudetenland. The Czech minority left inland and the Jewish minority was liquidated during the World War II. After the war, in execution of the Beneš decrees, the almost entire German population was expelled and Rýmařov was repopulated by Czech settlers.

Between 1955 and 1974, there was the greatest disruption to the historic character of the town, when most of the original buildings on the west side of the square and adjacent streets were demolished and replaced by new buildings.

Demographics

Sights

Houses with black roofs, both from the original slate or with newer roofing, are typical for Rýmařov and forms its characteristic panorama.

The town hall is the landmark od the town square and the whole town. It is a large building with elements of Gothic, Renaissance, Baroque and Neoclassical styles. It was first documented in 1560 and probably dates from the early 15th century. It was damaged several times by fire and subsequently rebuilt. The last major reconstruction was in 1790–1808, when it acquired its present-day Neoclassical and Empire appearance.

On the western part of Míru Square there is the Marian column from 1683. It was erected at the expense of Maria Elisabeth Richtenstein in memory of the plague epidemic that struck Rýmařov in 1680.

Janovice Castle was originally a late Gothic fortres, built in 1520–1530. It served as the seat of the owner of the estate. It was rebuilt into a Renaissance residence in 1586 and early Baroque alterations were made in 1663. In the 1840s, the castle was completely rebuilt in the late Baroque style. Today, the castle is partly used for cultural and social purposes. The rest of the castle is empty and unused. In 2018, it was purchased by the National Heritage Institute, which is planning its reconstruction.

The Chapel of the Visitation of the Virgin Mary is an important Baroque building from 1711–1715. It contains frescoes by Ferdinand Naboth and Johann Christoph Handke. In the foreground of the chapel is the statue of Our Lady of Victory from 1774 and a folk sculpture of the crucifixion from 1812.

The Roman Catholic parish Church of Saint Michael is originally a Gothic building. Its existence is proven already in the first half of the 14th century. After the fire in 1609 it was reconstructed in the Renaissance style. The original gothic tower was equipped with a wooden porch and a helmet with four turrets in the corners, the slender gothic windows were partly walled up. After the fire in 1790, a reconstruction took place during which Neoclassical and Neorenaissance elements were added. The alterations were not completed until 1818 by restoring the church tower to its present appearance. The interior of the church is decorated with paintings of Johann Christoph Handke.

The rectory is a valuable Renaissance building from the 16th century. It originally served as a mining office.

Museums
The Town Museum is an institution with collections tracing the history of the region from the earliest prehistoric settlements to the first half of the 20th century. It was founded in 1901 by a local businessman and then mayor of the town, Wilhelm Ludwig. The place offers exhibitions on the development of mining, textile industry, and regional geology.

There is an outdoor exposition of the Town Museum in the place of the protected archeological locality Hrádek, where a fortress was located in the 14th century.

The Museum of Tourist Stamps is a freely accessible exposition of the stamps.

Notable people
Johann Christoph Handke (1694–1774), Baroque painter
Eugen Jettel (1845–1901), Austrian painter
Otto Marburg (1874–1948), Austrian neurologist
Hana Marvanová (born 1962), lawyer and politician
Tomáš Ujfaluši (born 1978), footballer
Ivana Uhlířová (born 1980), actress

Twin towns – sister cities

Rýmařov is twinned with:

 Arco, Italy
 Belœil, Belgium
 Crosne, France
 Krompachy, Slovakia

 Ozimek, Poland
 Rajec, Slovakia
 Schotten, Germany
 Zeil am Main, Germany

References

External links

 

Cities and towns in the Czech Republic
Populated places in Bruntál District